The 2010 CHIO Rotterdam was the 2010 edition of the CHIO Rotterdam, the Dutch official show jumping and dressage horse show. It was held as CSIO 5* and CDIO 5*.

The first (national) horse show were held 1937 in Rotterdam, in 1948 it became an international horse show.

The 2010 edition of the CHIO Rotterdam was held between June 16, 2010 and June 20, 2010. The main sponsor of the 2010 CHIO Rotterdam horse show is LSI project investment.

Nations Cup of the Netherlands (dressage)
The 2010 dressage Nations Cup of the Netherlands was part of the 2010 CHIO Rotterdam horse show. Teams of six nations took part in this competition. The competition was held at June 17, 2010.

Team result 
The team ranking of this competition was endowed with 41,000 €.

(grey penalties points do not count for the team result)

Individual results

FEI Nations Cup of the Netherlands (show jumping) 
The 2010 FEI Nations Cup of the Netherlands was part of the 2010 CHIO Rotterdam. It was the fourth competition of the 2010 Meydan FEI Nations Cup.

The 2010 FEI Nations Cup of the Netherlands was held at Friday, June 18, 2010 at 2:30 pm. The competing teams were: France, the United States of America, Germany, Switzerland, the Netherlands, Ireland, Sweden, the United Kingdom (Great Britain), Spain and Poland.

The competition was a show jumping competition with two rounds and optionally one jump-off. The height of the fences were up to 1.60 meters. Eight of ten teams were allowed to start in the second round.

The competition is endowed with 200,000 €.

(grey penalties points do not count for the team result)

Grand Prix Freestyle 
The InterChem prijs, the Grand Prix Freestyle (or Grand Prix Kür) of the 2010 CHIO Rotterdam, was the final competition of the CDIO 5* at the 2010 CHIO Rotterdam. InterChem was the sponsor of this competition.

The competition was held at Saturday, June 19, 2010 at 8:00 pm. It is endowed with 50,000 €.

(Top 5 of 12 Competitors)

Longines Grand Prix Port of Rotterdam 
The Grand Prix was the mayor show jumping competition of the 2010 CHIO Rotterdam. The sponsor of this competition was Longines. It was held at Sunday, June 20, 2010 at 2:30 pm. The competition was a show jumping competition with one round and one jump-off, the height of the fences were up to 1.60 meters.

(Top 5 of 50 Competitors)

References

External links 
 official website
 timetable
 2010 results

2010 in show jumping
CHIO Rotterdam